Buseck is a municipality in the district of Gießen, in Hessen, Germany. It is situated 7 km northeast of Gießen. The villages in this municipality include Großen-Buseck, Beuern, Alten-Buseck, Oppenrod, and Trohe.

Großen-Buseck is the largest village, with 5.768 inhabitants. Trohe is the smallest, with 753 inhabitants.

References

Giessen (district)